The following is a list of the 29 cantons of the Isère department, in France, following the French canton reorganisation which came into effect in March 2015:

Bièvre
Bourgoin-Jallieu
Chartreuse-Guiers
Charvieu-Chavagneux
Échirolles
Fontaine-Seyssinet
Fontaine-Vercors
Le Grand-Lemps
Grenoble-1
Grenoble-2
Grenoble-3
Grenoble-4
Le Haut-Grésivaudan
L'Isle-d'Abeau
Matheysine-Trièves
Meylan
Morestel
Le Moyen Grésivaudan
Oisans-Romanche
Le Pont-de-Claix
Roussillon
Saint-Martin-d'Hères
Le Sud Grésivaudan
La Tour-du-Pin
Tullins
La Verpillière
Vienne-1
Vienne-2
Voiron

References